The 2002 AIG Japan Open Tennis Championships was a combined men's and women's tennis tournament played on outdoor hard courts at the Ariake Coliseum in Tokyo in Japan that was part of the International Series Gold of the 2002 ATP Tour and of Tier III of the 2002 WTA Tour. The tournament ran from September 30 through October 6, 2002. Kenneth Carlsen and Jill Craybas won the singles titles.

Finals

Men's singles

 Kenneth Carlsen defeated  Magnus Norman 7–6(8–6), 6–3
 It was Carlsen's only title of the year and the 2nd of his career.

Women's singles

 Jill Craybas defeated  Silvija Talaja 2–6, 6–4, 6–4
 It was Craybas' only title of the year and the 1st of her career.

Men's doubles

 Jeff Coetzee /  Chris Haggard defeated  Jan-Michael Gambill /  Graydon Oliver 7–6(7–4), 6–4
 It was Coetzee's 2nd title of the year and the 2nd of his career. It was Haggard's 2nd title of the year and the 3rd of his career.

Women's doubles

 Shinobu Asagoe /  Nana Miyagi defeated  Svetlana Kuznetsova /  Arantxa Sánchez-Vicario 6–4, 4–6, 6–4
 It was Asagoe's 2nd title of the year and the 2nd of her career. It was Miyagi's only title of the year and the 10th of her career.

References

External links
 Official website
 ATP tournament profile

AIG Japan Open Tennis Championships
AIG Japan Open Tennis Championships
Japan Open (tennis)
AIG Japan Open Tennis Championships
Japan Open Tennis Championships
Japan Open Tennis Championships
Japan Open Tennis Championships